Alice König is a British historian. She is Director of the Centre for the Literatures of the Roman Empire at the University of St Andrews and lectures in Latin and Classical Studies.

Biography
König studied for her BA and MPhil at King's College, Cambridge, and her PhD at St. John's College, Cambridge.  She was the chair of the research network for Literary Interactions under Nerva, Trajan & Hadrian, a British Academy funded project, and is now co-running a research project on Visualising War: Interplay between Battle Narratives in Ancient and Modern Cultures. König is a member of the Young Academy of Scotland (YAS) established by the Royal Society of Edinburgh in 2011, and in 2018 she was elected as co-chair 2019–2020. The organisation provides mid-career professionals with a platform to challenge social issues in Scotland and the wider world. König is particularly involved in YAS projects on Responsible Debate and the future of tertiary education in Scotland. She has written for The Scotsman, serves on the Royal Society of Edinburgh's Human Rights Committee, and is a Community Ambassador for the charity Book Aid International.

König has appeared on the BBC Radio 4 In Our Time panel as an expert on "Agrippina the Younger" (2016), "Pliny the Younger" (2013) and "Vitruvius' De Architectura" (2012).

Selected publications 
König, Alice and Whitton, Christopher (2018) Roman Literature under Nerva, Hadrian and Trajan: literary interactions, AD 96-138 (Cambridge University Press)
König, Alice (2018) 'Reading Civil War in Frontinus' Strategemata: a case study for Flavian Literary Studies', in After 69 CE: Writing Civil War in Flavian Rome. ed. / Lauren Donovan Ginsberg; Darcy A Krasne. de Gruyter, p. 145-178

References 

Year of birth missing (living people)
Living people
British women historians
Academics of the University of St Andrews
Alumni of King's College, Cambridge
Alumni of St John's College, Cambridge
Historians of ancient Rome
Women classical scholars